Roll on Columbia: Woody Guthrie and the Columbia River Songs is a 2011 documentary film concerning Woody Guthrie's music created for Columbia River projects, especially "Roll On, Columbia, Roll On". It premiered at McMenamin's Pub in Troutdale, Oregon. In the documentary, oral historian Michael O'Rourke is interviewed about Guthrie's month of songwriting in Oregon and Washington. O'Rourke also produced the film. The film was spawned from a radio documentary that O'Rourke did for Oregon Public Broadcasting.

References

External links
 (University of Oregon)
The Columbia 1949 public domain film with Guthrie's soundtrack

2011 films
Documentary films about music and musicians
Documentary films about the Pacific Northwest
Woody Guthrie